WBOS (92.9 MHz, "Rock 92-9") is a commercial FM radio station licensed to Brookline, Massachusetts, and serving Greater Boston. WBOS is owned and operated by Beasley Broadcast Group. The studios and offices are in Waltham.  WBOS airs a classic rock radio format, which it calls "the next generation of classic rock."  While rival WZLX's playlist extends from the 1960s and 1970s into the 1980s and 1990s, WBOS concentrates on the 1990s and early 2000s, with some 1980s titles.  "Dave and Chuck the Freak," syndicated from co-owned WRIF in Detroit, are heard weekday mornings on WBOS.

WBOS has an effective radiated power (ERP) of 18,500 watts.  The transmitter is on the top of the Prudential Tower in Boston's Back Bay neighborhood. WBOS broadcasts in the HD Radio hybrid format.  The HD2 subchannel simulcasts WRCA, which carries business news programming from Bloomberg Radio.

History

Early years

On April 1, 1960, WBOS-FM signed-on, simulcasting most of the programming of its sister station WBOS (now WUNR). WBOS-AM-FM were owned by the Champion Broadcasting System with studios at 790 Commonwealth Avenue.

Most of the AM station's programming was beautiful music, but when the AM side began to broadcast ethnic programming, the FM side continued to play beautiful music, which was branded on both AM and FM as "Boston's Music Theatre." In 1975, WBOS-FM changed to a hodgepodge format which did not gain much of an audience.

Disco
In 1978, Boston radio personality Ron Robin, disappointed that the airtime for his weekly disco music show on WVBF had been cut back, left WVBF and began doing a four-hour Sunday-night disco show for WBOS-FM. Initially, Robin bought the airtime and sold commercials for the show.

The success of that show led to WBOS-FM hiring Robin, and a rapid expansion of the disco programming, first to seven nights a week from 8:00 p.m. to midnight (April 1978), and then to 24/7 in September 1978. For a brief time in late 1978 and early 1979, WBOS-FM was one of Boston's most popular radio stations. But when WXKS-FM came on the scene with a highly promoted disco format, including big promotions and hiring away some WBOS disc jockeys, WBOS' ratings suffered.

WRKO midday legend J.J. Wright (later at WODS) was one of the original disco DJs for WBOS when the station went round-the-clock disco in 1978. Longtime, sought-after producer Jack King (WBIM-FM, WVBF, and WBZ) created, wrote and engineered most of the station's disco specials at the time. King was there at the beginning of the station's format change to disco and worked closely with Robin to 'keep the beat going' into the late 1970s and early 1980s. When WBOS changed to adult contemporary music, the duo went to WBZ Radio for a long, successful stint there.

Adult contemporary
In January 1980, the station flipped to an adult contemporary format which was a little less "adult" and a little more "contemporary," but that format would only run for two years.

Rock 
In January 1982, WBOS flipped to a short-lived attempt at an album-oriented rock (AOR) format, programmed for some of that time by legendary Boston rock personalities Jerry Goodwin and Maxanne Satori. However, the rock format didn't make any inroads against established rockers like WBCN, WCOZ, and WAAF.

Country 
On July 14, 1983, WBOS' format was abruptly changed to country music, and was moderately successful for several years.  It was the only FM country station in the Boston market at the time.

Program director and morning personality Dean James, along with general sales manager Dave DiGregorio, worked to bring country to the mainstream in Boston, a city with little history as a country music stronghold. The country format ran for six years.

Adult album alternative
On April 27, 1989, at 3:00 p.m., WBOS dropped country and adopted an adult album alternative (AAA) format, initially with a bit more of an eclectic focus than most AAA stations at the time, incorporating classic rock, soul, R&B, and singer-songwriter cuts into the playlist, along with new releases. Eventually, the station gravitated more toward current material and new releases. At that time, when CDs were just starting to be used in radio, WBOS promoted itself as the first all-compact disc radio station, eliminating vinyl, and very sparingly using carts for some songs. Unusually, the vinyl themed retro show "The Lost 45s" with Barry Scott aired on Sunday nights after leaving WZLX.

In April 2005, WBOS made changes to play more music and decrease the amount of talk. The station's morning show, hosted by Bill Abbate and Kristin Lessard, was abruptly cancelled to make way for the DJ-free "All Music Mornings." "It's putting the station somewhat back to where it started in terms of its ideals. Listener perception is that radio plays too many commercials and that DJs can be boring and irrelevant," said Buzz Knight, operations manager for WBOS. Knight said that WBOS will be "the cool station for people over 30."

In September 2007, George Knight began hosting morning drive on the station, but that would be short lived. That same month, owner Greater Media registered domains that showed that the station was possibly flipping to sports talk as 92.9 The Ticket, complete with a logo and a slogan, "Boston's Only FM Sports Station." The station was rumored to flip on October 1 of that year, but never materialized. WBMX (now WBZ-FM) and WMKK (now WEEI-FM) eventually flipped to the sports format over the next five years.

Alternative rock

On February 1, 2008, at 5:00 p.m., the station saw its biggest change since flipping to AAA in 1989, as the format switched to alternative rock and the station rebranded as "Radio 92-9." While George Knight continued to host his popular "Sunday Morning Over Easy" program, and music director Dana Marshall was promoted to Program Director, the rest of the station's airstaff was let go. After WBCN's demise in 2010, WBOS adopted a mainstream rock direction, but continued to report on Mediabase and Nielsen BDS on the alternative panel. This was due to the addition of bands like Def Leppard and Guns n Roses to the playlist. The move left WFNX once again as Boston's only pure alternative rock station. Around 2012, WBOS reverted to playing mostly alternative tracks, while playing some classic hard rock tracks (but at a very minimal amount), usually from artists/bands such as Led Zeppelin, Van Halen, Aerosmith, AC/DC, Metallica, Pink Floyd, Billy Idol, and Guns N' Roses. By July 2012, WBOS became Boston's only alternative rock station following the closure of WFNX.

On July 13, 2016, WBOS rebranded as "Alt 92-9." The station slowly added more air personalities back to the station during this time. 

In July 2017, WBOS began carrying the Dave and Chuck The Freak morning show out of sister station WRIF. That same year, the station began broadcasting Boston Bruins hockey games that conflict with New England Patriots games, the arrangement followed Beasley's acquisition of WBZ-FM, the flagship station for both teams.

Classic rock
On April 11, 2019, at 10:30 a.m., following the "Dave & Chuck the Freak Morning Show" (and after playing "Bury a Friend" by Billie Eilish), WBOS flipped to classic rock, branded as "Rock 92-9." The first song on "Rock" was "For Those About to Rock (We Salute You)" by AC/DC.

The change followed a transition from a classic rock-classic hits hybrid to a more conventional classic hits format at sister station WROR-FM, leaving space for a competitor to market powerhouse WZLX. The station brought back two DJs previously heard on WBCN during its later rock years: Adam 12 hosts midday and Hardy hosts afternoons.

Owners

WBOS was originally owned by Boston businessman Herbert Hoffman. In the 1980s, he sold it to Sconnix, which later sold it to Ackerley Media in 1988. The station was sold to Granum Communications in 1992, which merged with Infinity Broadcasting in 1996. In 1997, the station was traded to Greater Media.

On July 19, 2016, Beasley Media Group announced it would acquire Greater Media and its 21 stations (including WBOS) for $240 million. The FCC approved the sale on October 6, 2016, and the sale closed on November 1, 2016.

HD Radio

WBOS broadcasts using the iBiquity HD Radio digital broadcasting system, and had an HD secondary channel called "The Coffee House," which launched in early 2006. This format consisted of "the acoustic, unplugged side of triple A" by using the "station's archive of live and in-studio performances," and emphasized "singer-songwriters, folk music and unplugged versions of songs by core WBOS artists."

The "Coffee House" format was later replaced with Radio You Boston, featuring content programmed by college-aged residents of the Boston area. It was later re-branded as Local 92.9, and featured local music artists from the Boston area.

On July 3, 2017, Beasley announced that Bloomberg Radio programming would be moved from WXKS to sister WRCA, simulcast on a new FM translator W291CZ, and also carried on WBOS-HD2.

Past personalities

 J. J. Wright
 Ron Robin
 Jack King
 Neal Robert
 Charles Laquidara
 Barry Scott of The Lost 45s
 Dick Pleasants
 Maria Morgan
 Carolyn Morrell
 Liz Solar
 Bill Smith
 Cliff Nash
 Loretta Crawford
 Kevin Malvey
 Bill Abbate
 Kristin Lessard
 Amy Brooks
 Melissa Gaudette
 Gerrie Burke
 John Laurenti
 Eduardo Nash
 Joanne Doody
 PD-George Taylor Morris
 Robin Young
 Julie Devereaux
 Dave DiGregorio
 Keith Murray
 David O'Leary
 Hutch
 Dominic Lewis
 PD-Chris Hermann
 PD-Shirley Moldanado
 PD-Jim Herron
 Matt Phipps
 George Knight
 Bob Bayne
 Kevin Collins
 Bobby V – Bob Vartanian

Trivia
 WBOS was also the call sign of a shortwave radio station operated by Westinghouse's WBZ affiliate during the 1940s. (The 92.9 frequency now occupied by WBOS was one of the early frequencies used by WBZ's FM station in the 1950s).
 Arnie Ginsburg was the nighttime host on WBOS (AM), one of Boston's first rock-and-roll DJs. However, by the time the FM station signed on, his show had moved to WMEX 1510 AM.
 Charles Laquidara hosted a show from Maui entitled WBOS Backspin during the Spring of 2006. The show aired commercial-free on weekdays, from 9:00 a.m. to 10:00 a.m., live.
 Studio 7 is the recording area where common heard artists on the station record and play some of their songs live. Since 1992, John Mellencamp, Sarah McLachlan, John Mayer, Lionel Richie, Barenaked Ladies, Alanis Morissette, and others have performed here while on tour in a major venue in Boston, including Boston Garden, Tweeter Center, etc.
 Mellencamp's Jack and Diane live version has been recorded at Studio 7.

References

External links

 Boston.com article on the new format (2005)

 WBOS data

BOS
BOS
Classic rock radio stations in the United States
Radio stations established in 1960
BOS
Brookline, Massachusetts
Mass media in Norfolk County, Massachusetts
1960 establishments in Massachusetts